(Latin for "a thing done between some does not harm or benefit others") is a law doctrine which holds that a contract cannot adversely affect the rights of one who is not a party to the contract.

"" has a common meaning: "A matter between others is not our business."

Insurance contracts

Many UK cases cite insurance contracts as being res inter alios acta.
It seems to be in line with the "privity of contract" doctrine.

Case law: George E. Taylor & Co. v. Percy Trentham (1980)

Taylor were nominated subcontractors to Trentham. They also had a contract with the employer (collateral contract) whereby they warranted due performance of the subcontract works so that the main contractors should not become entitled to an extension of time. The employer paid Trentham only £7,526 against an interim certificate of £22,101. The amount withheld was the balance payable to the subcontractors after deduction of the main contractor's claim against them for delay. It was held that the employer was not entitled to withhold the money as the contract between the employer and the subcontractor was res inter alios acta.

References
 

Contract law
Legal rules with Latin names